The Confederate States Bureau of Indian Affairs was a subdivision of the Confederate States War Department established in 1861 to handle the duties the War Department was charged with regarding the Confederacy's relations with the various Indian Nations with which it interacted.

Commissioners of the Bureau

Commanders of the Department of the Indian Territory

References
Worldstatesmen.org

Government of the Confederate States of America
1861 establishments in the Confederate States of America
1865 disestablishments in the Confederate States of America
United States Bureau of Indian Affairs